Angela Gerekou (born April 15, 1959) is a Greek actress and politician. Currently serving as President of Greek National Tourism Organization (GNTO) from 2019. 

She served as Deputy Minister of the Ministry of Culture and Sport from 2014 to 2015 and from 2009 to 2010. Also served as MP for the Hellenic Parliament from 2004 to 2012.

Biography

Early life
Angela Gerekou was born in Corfu, in the Ionian Sea, Greece.

Movie career
Her good looks got her noticed in the 1980s by producers and directors of the then-flourishing Greek cinema.

Politician
Angela Gerekou served as Deputy Minister of the Ministry of Culture and Sport in the cabinet of George Papandreou from 2009 to 2010.

Personal life
Angela Gerekou married Greek actor and singer Tolis Voskopoulos, with whom she had a 

daughter named Maria in 2001.

External links
Angela Gerekou
Angela Gerekou's Personal Life
 Βιογραφικό στην ιστοσελίδα του ΠΑΣΟΚ
 Βιογραφικό σημείωμα στην σελίδα του Υπουργείου Πολιτισμού και Τουρισμού
 Μπαίνει στη βουλή η Άντζελα Γκερέκου

PASOK politicians
Greek film actresses
Greek stage actresses
Greek television actresses
20th-century Greek actresses
21st-century Greek actresses
1959 births
Living people
Actors from Corfu
Greek MPs 2004–2007
Greek MPs 2007–2009
Greek MPs 2009–2012
Greek MPs 2012–2014
MPs of Corfu
Women members of the Hellenic Parliament
21st-century Greek politicians
21st-century Greek women politicians
Politicians from Corfu
Greek architects